Yu Hua is a Chinese author born in 1960.

Yu Hua may also refer to:
Yu Hua (rower) (born 1981), Chinese female rower

See also
Yuhua (disambiguation)